The twelfth generation of the Ford F-Series is a light-duty pickup truck that was produced by Ford from the 2009 to 2014 model years.  Initially slotted between the Ford Ranger and Ford Super Duty in size, the F-150 became the smallest Ford truck in North America following the 2011 withdrawal of the Ranger (in North America). The final generation of the F-150 produced with a separate body design from the Super Duty trucks (F-250 to F-550), the twelfth generation again adopted an all-new chassis and body, also marking an extensive transition to the powertrain lineup.

Alongside the all-new model design, the new generation started a model shift for the F-150. In all but the most fleet-oriented trim levels, Ford introduced higher-quality interior materials and features. In the United States, the Lincoln Mark LT was repackaged as the highest-content Ford F-150 Platinum trim (a Mark LT based on the twelfth generation was designed, exclusive to Mexico). For 2010, the SVT Raptor was introduced as the highest-performance F-Series truck; in contrast to the previous Ford SVT Lightning trucks, the Raptor was optimized for off-road performance.

In North America, the twelfth-generation F-150 was assembled by Ford at its Dearborn Truck facility (Dearborn, Michigan) and its Kansas City Assembly facility (Claycomo, Missouri).  In December 2014, production of the model line ended, with Ford introducing the thirteenth-generation F-series.

Design history
Ford revealed the 2009 F-150 design at the 2008 North American International Auto Show in Detroit. Development began under chief engineer Matt O'Leary in November 2003 under the code name "P-415", after P-221 production began in June 2003. General design work was done under Patrick Schiavone into late 2005, with further exterior changes taking place during late 2006 to the tailgate design and wheel lip arches during a development hiatus. The final design freeze later took place by early 2007. Production of the series began in October 2008 at Ford's Kansas City Assembly Plant.

Ford originally planned to expand the F-Series platform by reintroducing the F-100 as a midsize truck. Known internally as P525, the F-100 would have served as the global replacement for Ford Ranger in 2010 or 2011, The project was ultimately shelved, with the company developing the Ranger T6 as a global midsize truck and in North America, Ford focused on developing fuel-efficient powertrains such as the EcoBoost V6 and the 6-speed automatic transmission for the F-150.

The 2009 F-150 featured a larger and more flexible interior, an updated three-bar grille, and additional choices of trim levels. The chassis included lighter-weight, high-strength steel for better fuel economy and safety and improved payload and towing capacity.  For the first time in the history of the F-Series, a V8 engine was standard in all models; no 6-cylinder was available. All F-150s included an automatic transmission as standard equipment, as a manual transmission was no longer available. Regular cab models were once again produced with standard-length doors rather than two short, rear-opening doors. All Flareside models in 2009 were made with new badging on the previous generation's boxes and were discontinued at the end of the model year when stock had run out, echoing a similar situation in the first year of the eighth generation. The interior was more luxurious and offered more features than previous-generation trucks. The Ford Sync system became available for the first time, including both Bluetooth functionality, and USB and auxiliary inputs, and a premium Sony audio system was also available for the first time on higher trim levels. The center stack was also redesigned to integrate the audio system and climate controls into a single unit (the base XL model still included a separate AM/FM radio unit with an auxiliary audio input as standard equipment). The instrument cluster was now the same in all trim levels of the F-150 (and now included a tachometer as standard equipment), although the gauge facings still varied by trim level.

For the 2010 model year, the SVT Raptor off-road truck was introduced. Initially available as a SuperCab with a 5.5-foot box, it was available with either a 320 hp 5.4L V8 or an optional 411 hp 6.2L V8 from the Super Duty line. The standard wheel diameter on FX4 models was enlarged to 18".

For 2010, the F-150 saw minimal changes, although the warning chimes were changed to match the rest of the new Ford lineup. The keyless entry remote design was also changed, and now offered integrated remote start (previously, opting for remote start would require an additional, single-button remote), as well as an integrated key. Also new for 2010 was the new MyKey system as standard equipment on all F-150 models (excluding the base XL, where the MyKey system was an option). The MyKey system allowed for parents of younger drivers, as well as fleet operators, to configure one of the vehicle's ignition keys as the vehicle's MyKey, and could limit the vehicle's top speed, mute the vehicle's audio system until the driver's seatbelt was fastened, limit the maximum volume of the audio system, and provide both audible and visual warnings whenever a predetermined speed was reached. When the MyKey system was enabled, a message would appear on the instrument cluster display screen, denoting "MyKey Active, Drive Safely", to remind the driver to drive responsibly.

2011 marked a major upgrade to the powertrain lineup. In the interest of increasing fuel economy, both versions of the 4.6L V8 and the 5.4L V8 were discontinued. In their place were a 3.7L V6 and a 5.0L V8. Between the two engines was an all-new 3.5L twin-turbocharged V6. Dubbed EcoBoost, the 3.5L V6 produced 365 hp. Also for 2011, the instrument cluster was redesigned, and a new "premium" instrument cluster was introduced with a 4.2-inch (4.2") color LCD "Productivity Screen" that included "Truck Apps" that provided information such as approach and departure angles, altitude, current 4WD system status, and other important information. The base XL trim received new styled steel wheels as standard equipment, replacing the older, five-spoke styled steel wheels that were carryover wheels from the Ford F-Series (eleventh generation).

For 2012, the F-150 sported a ten-grade lineup (XL, STX, XLT, FX2, FX4, Lariat, King Ranch, Platinum, Harley-Davidson and SVT Raptor).

For 2013, the F-150 received minor changes such as 3 new grilles (replacing all 4 previous grilles), new optional 18-inch, 20-inch, or 22-inch wheels, Sync with MyFord, MyFord Touch navigation system, new power-folding and telescoping trailer tow mirrors (taken from the 2008+ Super Duty models), high-intensity discharge headlamps, 3 new color options (Blue Jeans Metallic, Kodiak Brown Metallic and Ruby Red Clearcoat Metallic), new Alcantara seats in the FX Appearance Package, black or pecan leather in Platinum, the return of the Limited model (directly replacing the Harley-Davidson trim level), and the 6.2-liter V8 being made available in XLT, FX2, and FX4 (SuperCab and SuperCrew only).

For 2014, a special edition called the Tremor was introduced, essentially an EcoBoost-equipped FX2 or FX4 truck in a regular cab model with a 6.5' bed, a special FX Appearance Package, a flow-through center console with bucket seats and a 4.10 rear gear final drive ratio.

Also new in 2014, the STX trim level also became available on SuperCrew models with the 5.5' box. In addition, an STX Sport package was added for 2014 including 20" wheels, black cloth seats, and black exterior accents.

Powertrain
The 3-valve 5.4 and 4.6 liter V8s were mated to Ford's new 6R80E 6-speed automatic transmission while the 4R75E 4-speed automatic transmission was carried over for the 2-valve 4.6 L V8. The 4.2 L OHV V6 engine, which had been available, was dropped due to the closure of the Essex engine plant where it was produced.

For the 2011 model year, an all-new engine lineup was offered. Two of the engines, a 3.7 L V6 and a 5.0 L V8, both based on the 2011 Ford Mustang engines, both offer E85 flex-fuel capability. The 6.2 L V8 used in the 2011 Ford Super Duty was made available with the F-150 Platinum, Lariat, SVT Raptor, Harley Davidson and "Lariat Limited" Editions (only approximately 3700 made). Finally, the 3.5 L direct-injected twin-turbo EcoBoost V6 was offered in the F-150 starting in early 2011. All engines were paired with a new six-speed automatic transmission (6R80). Electric power-assisted steering was made available on all engines besides the 6.2. Since 2008, the Ford F-150 has towing and hauling capacity of 11,300 lbs and 3,060 lbs, respectively.

Safety 

The 2009 Ford F-150 featured front-seat side impact airbags and Ford's Safety Canopy System for the first and second rows as head protection in the event of a side impact. It also featured Ford's exclusive ADVANCETRAC RSC (Roll Stability Control)--an electronic Stability control and anti-rollover safety feature also available in other Ford vehicles, from the Fusion to the Expedition.

The F-150 comes standard with AdvanceTrac Electronic Stability Control, front and rear row side curtain airbags, and front row torso side airbags.

Safety Ratings can be found here (https://www.nhtsa.gov/ratings).

Concepts 
At the 2008 SEMA show, four 2009 Ford F-150s were unveiled: the F-150 Heavy Duty DEWALT Contractor, the FX-4 by X-Treme Toyz, the F-150 by Street Scene Equipment, and the Hi-Pa Drive F-150. The Heavy Duty DEWALT Contractor was built in a DeWalt theme. The FX-4, also called Fahrenheit F-150, was built for outdoor lifestyle enthusiasts. The Street Scene Equipment version is a lowered truck built with performance and style.

Trim

XL - Included: Vinyl upholstery, post-crash alert system, manual mirrors (power mirrors on SuperCrew), 17" steel wheels, tinted windows, air conditioning, an AM/FM stereo with clock, power accessory delay, tachometer, and manual windows and locks (power windows and locks with auto driver's side window on SuperCrew)
STX (Sport Truck Off-road) - Added: STX decals, body color bumpers, 17" alloy wheels, an AM/FM stereo with single-CD player and an auxiliary input jack, cloth upholstery, front seat armrest with cupholders and storage bin, and rear cupholders (SuperCab)
XLT - Added: chrome bumpers, keyless entry, power mirrors, 17" alloy wheels, automatic headlamps, color-coordinated carpet and floor mats, power locks and windows with automatic driver's side window, visors with covered mirrors, compass, tinted rear windows, and later, fog lamps.
FX4/FX2 - Added: FX4 off-road decals, fog lamps, keypad entry, 18" alloy wheels, locking rear axle, skid plates, trailer tow package, SIRIUS Satellite radio with 6-month subscription, leather-wrapped steering wheel, power driver's seat, and rear window defroster. Later features were a 120V power inverter, message center, Ford SYNC.
Lariat - Added: monotone paint, power, heated mirrors with memory, turn signals and auto-dimming driver's side feature, 18" bright alloy wheels, body color door handles, lighted visor mirrors, dual zone automatic temp control, Ford SYNC, message center, heated front seats, color-coordinated leather-wrapped steering wheel with audio controls, 10-way power front seats, memory driver's seat, leather trimmed seats, auto-dimming rear view mirror, and power pedals with memory. 
King Ranch - Added: two tone paint, power fold, heated, chrome capped sideview mirrors with turn signals, memory, security approach lamps, and auto-dimming driver's side, 18" 7-spoke wheels with King Ranch logo, color coordinated box side rail and platform running boards, chaparral-leather wrapped steering wheel, an AM/FM stereo with 6-disc in dash CD player with MP3 capability and speed compensated volume control, garage door opener, chaparral leather trimmed power, heated and cooled front seats, front flow-through console with chaparral leather trimmed lid and floor shifter, King Ranch badges and mats, reverse sensing system, back up camera, and later, remote start.
Platinum - Added: body color bumpers, PLATINUM badges, front tow hooks, chrome door handles, power deployable running boards, power fold, heated, chrome capped mirrors with turn signals, memory, security approach lamps, and auto-dimming driver's side, 20" aluminum wheels, chrome exhaust tip, bright bodyside accent moldings, unique leather-wrapped steering wheel with power tilt column, memory and audio controls, brushed aluminum applique on center panel and console, an AM/FM stereo with 6-disc in-dash CD player with MP3 capability and speed compensated volume control, sun visors with illuminated mirrors, garage door opener, leather trimmed power, heated and cooled front seats, flow through console, with leather-trimmed lid and floor shifter, power sliding rear window, rain sensing windshield wipers, reverse sensing system, and back up camera. Later standard features were remote start.
Lariat Limited (2011 only) - Added (from Lariat): 6.2L V8 engine, power assisted steering, a Sony AM/FM stereo with single-CD/DVD player and navigation, rear view camera, remote start, unique cluster, blacked out headlamps, body color door handles with chrome strap, two-tone leather trimmed seats, body color bumpers, LIMITED lettering, power deployable running boards, trailer brake controller, 22" forged aluminum wheels, power heated mirrors with memory, turn signals, and auto dimming driver's side, and security approach lamps, heated rear seats, and power sunroof.
Harley-Davidson - Added (from Lariat): 6.2L V8 engine, power assisted steering, a Sony AM/FM stereo with single-CD/DVD player and navigation, rear view camera, remote start, black and silver leather-trimmed seats with Harley-Davidson logo, engine tuned insert, floor shifter, heated rear seats, memory adjustable pedals, remote start, "HARLEY DAVIDSON F-150" tailgate and fender badges, power deployable running boards, trailer brake controller, 22" alloy wheels, and unique clusters.
SVT Raptor - Added (from XLT): 6.2L V8 engine, power driver's seat, Hill Descent Control, leather-and-cloth upholstery, power-sliding rear window, trailer tow package, auto dimming rearview mirror with compass, leather wrapped steering wheel with audio controls and SYNC, message center and trip computer, SIRIUS Satellite radio, air extractors in hood, 17" painted alloy wheels with off-road tires, front and rear tow hooks, and keyless entry keypad.

Ford SVT Raptor 

For 2010, Ford introduced the F-150 SVT Raptor, the third F-Series truck developed by Ford SVT.  In line with the previous SVT Lightnings, the Raptor was the highest-performance F-Series truck, including modifications to the chassis and powertrain.  In sharp contrast to the street and track-oriented Lightning, the Raptor was developed as a street-legal version of a desert racing vehicle.

Distinguished by its "FORD" grille badging, the SVT Raptor is fitted with a redesigned wide-track suspension, allowing for much longer wheel travel; other electronics optimized its traction both on and off-road.  Powered by a 411 hp 6.2L V8 from the Super Duty trucks (a 310 hp 5.4L V8 was offered in 2010), the Raptor was the most powerful version of the F-150.

Initially offered as a SuperCab, the Raptor was also offered as a SuperCrew 4-door.

Chinese copy controversy

In 2014, Chinese company Jiangsu Kawei Automotive released the Kawei K1, which appeared to be nearly identical to the Ford F-150.

When interviewed by Fox News in 2014, a Ford spokesman said they were aware of the Kawei and their legal counsel was investigating how best to address the matter.

References

12th generation
Pickup trucks
Rear-wheel-drive vehicles
All-wheel-drive vehicles
Cars introduced in 2008
2010s cars
Flexible-fuel vehicles
Motor vehicles manufactured in the United States